The Dalton Convention Center is a multi-purpose venue in Dalton, Georgia built in 1991.  Owned by the city of Dalton and by Whitfield County, the Convention Center is operated by the general manager and director of tourism, Doug Phipps and Margaret Thigpen.

In addition to being home to the Georgia Athletic High School Coaches' Hall of Fame, the Convention Center's arena has a maximum seating capacity of 2,100 and was home to the Georgia Rampage of the X-League Indoor Football. Another indoor football team, the Peach State Cats, also announced the Dalton Convention Center as their home arena for the 2018 season, but became a traveling team and never played a home game in Dalton.

References

External links
 The Dalton Convention Center official website

Indoor arenas in Georgia (U.S. state)
Sports venues in Georgia (U.S. state)
Buildings and structures in Whitfield County, Georgia
Tourist attractions in Whitfield County, Georgia
1991 establishments in Georgia (U.S. state)
Sports venues completed in 1991